Jonathan Lynam is a Gaelic footballer who plays for The Downs and at senior level for the Westmeath county team.

He got given his first start for Westmeath when they played Kildare in the 2022 O'Byrne Cup. He was put in for his first start in the 2022 National League against Wicklow in the first game. Come season end he could count himself as a Tailteann Cup champion. He was a target of the foul that lowered Laois numbers down to 14 because it got a second yellow card in the first Tailteann Cup game.

Honours
The Downs
 Westmeath Senior Football Championship (1): 2022

Westmeath
 Tailteann Cup (1): 2022

References

Year of birth missing (living people)
Living people
The Downs Gaelic footballers
Westmeath inter-county Gaelic footballers